The Treaty of Bassein (1534) was signed by Sultan of Guzerat and the Kingdom of Portugal on 23 December 1534, while on board the galleon São Mateus. Based on the terms of the treaty, the Portuguese Empire gained control of the city centre of Baçaim now Bassein (Vasai), as well as the neighbouring subjected tracts of land and stretches of sea. The Bombay Islands (Ilhas de Bombaim) which were then ruled from Portuguese Goa included: Colabá Grande, Colabá Pequeno, Bom Bahia (Bombay), Mazagaon, Vorlim, Matungá, and Mahim. Salsette, Damão é Dio, Taana, Kalyan & Chaul were among the town centres controlled and settled by the Portuguese.

At the time of the cession, the Bombay Port was a minor backwater, it became a major cosmopolis and trade centre when the place passed from the Portuguese to the English in 1661, with the dowry of Catherine de Braganza. The Bombay Presidency and the present day Mumbai Metropolitan Area are the  treaty's most important long-term results.

See also
List of treaties
Military history of Bassein

External links
Mumbai Customs
Mumbai - The Cosmopolitan City
Vasai History

1534 treaties
1534 in Portugal
Gujarat Sultanate
Bassein
History of Vasai